Carpinteiro is an occupational surname literally meaning "carpenter" in Portuguese and Galician languages. Notable people with this surname include: 

José Manuel Carpinteiro,  Portuguese sports shooter
, Portuguese actress and writer
José Jefferson Carpinteiro Peres (1932–2008), commonly known as Jefferson Peres, Brazilian professor and politician

Portuguese-language surnames
Galician-language surnames
Occupational surnames